Goran Stavrevski (born 2 January 1974 in Poeševo, SFR Yugoslavia) is a Macedonian football defender who despite his age is still active by playing for FK Poeševo in the OFL Bitola, Macedonia's fourth tier, together with another well known veteran in Toni Micevski.

International career
Stavrevski made his debut for the Republic of Macedonian national team in September 1998 Malta and has earned a total of 41 caps and 3 goals.

In 1999, Stavrevski scored a last minute equalizer for Macedonia against the Republic of Ireland in the final UEFA Euro 2000 qualification match which denied the Irish a place in the finals, giving the berth instead to former compatriots FR Yugoslavia. His final international was a February 2005 FIFA World Cup qualification match against Andorra.

Honours
NK Zagreb
Prva HNL: 2001–02

References

External links 
 
 Career history at Weltfussball.de  
 Profile at MacedonianFootball.com 
 Football Federation of Macedonia 

1974 births
Living people
People from Bitola Municipality
Association football defenders
Macedonian footballers
North Macedonia international footballers
FK Pelister players
NK Zagreb players
Diyarbakırspor footballers
Macedonian First Football League players
Croatian Football League players
Süper Lig players
TFF First League players
Macedonian Second Football League players
Macedonian expatriate footballers
Expatriate footballers in Croatia
Macedonian expatriate sportspeople in Croatia
Expatriate footballers in Turkey
Macedonian expatriate sportspeople in Turkey